Philodromus parietalis is a spider species found in Spain and France.

See also 
 List of Philodromidae species

References

External links 

parietalis
Spiders of Europe
Spiders described in 1875